Leonard P. Wishart III (born September 24, 1934) is a retired lieutenant general in the United States Army. He was Commandant of the United States Army Command and General Staff College from July 14, 1988 to August 15, 1991. He later served as the first Director of Non-Legislative and Financial Services of the United States House of Representatives from 1992 to 1994.

External links

References

1934 births
United States Army generals
Living people